Anatolian Arabic is several qeltu varieties of Arabic spoken in the Turkish provinces of Mardin, Siirt, Batman, Diyarbakır, and Muş, a subset of North Mesopotamian Arabic. Since most Jews and Christians have left the area, the vast majority of remaining speakers are Sunni Muslims and the bulk live in the Mardin area. Most speakers also know Turkish and many, especially those from mixed Kurdish-Arab villages, speak Kurdish. Especially in isolated areas, the language has been significantly influenced by Turkish, Kurdish, and historically Turoyo (the latter in the western dialect area).

Mardin dialect is mutually intelligible with Moslawi dialect in Iraq. However, the peripheral varieties in Siirt, Muş, and Batman provinces near Lake Van are quite divergent.

Mesopotamian Arabic is spoken to the west, by about 100,000 people in Sanliurfa Province, as well as North Levantine Arabic with over a million speakers in Adana, Hatay, and Mersin provinces. Anatolian Arabic is not mutually intelligible with the Urfa dialect.

References

Further reading
 
 

North Mesopotamian Arabic
Languages of Turkey